Todd Kessler is an American film and television writer, producer and director.

Todd Kessler may also refer to:

Todd A. Kessler, head writer and co-creator of the TV series Damages
Todd Ellis Kessler, American television producer and writer
Todd Kessler, contestant on the third season of the U.S. version of The Voice